Chris Sander may refer to:

 Chris Sander (footballer) (born 1962), Welsh footballer
 Chris Sander (scientist), computational biologist
 Chris Sander (Missouri politician), member of the Missouri House of Representatives from the 33rd district